The Viral Fever, abbreviated to TVF, is an Indian video on demand and over-the-top streaming service and YouTube channel started by TVF Media Labs in 2010, and currently owned and operated by Contagious Online Media Network Private Limited. According to the founder Arunabh Kumar, the thought behind starting TVF was to reach out to the younger generation who seldom watch television entertainment.

The Viral Fever was one of the early arrivals on the Indian digital entertainment segment with videos covering a range of topics on Indian politics, movies, lifestyle, and emerging social concepts. The Viral Fever was the pioneer of web series in India with cult hits like Permanent Roommates, TVF Pitchers and TVF Tripling.

The company runs the app and website TVFPlay to host their videos. TVF conceptualised the idea of promoting movies through the creation and distribution of original digital content. The Ishq Wala song series is one such venture.

Their first web series, Permanent Roommates, debuted in 2014. It was the second most-viewed long-form web series in the world by June 2015. A second original series titled TVF Pitchers was released in June 2015. It portrays engineers at different companies who quit their jobs to create a startup company. Owing to its growing popularity, with both TVF Pitchers and Permanent Roommates being watched by millions around the globe, the company received $10 million in funding from Tiger Global in February 2016.

Background

Early days
After graduating from IIT Kharagpur, Arunabh Kumar quit his job as a consultant for the red chillies entertainment to try his hand at production jobs, assisting Farah Khan on Om Shanti Om. After a few production jobs, Kumar began to write and produce his own short films and videos.

Kumar, along with long-time friends and IIT alumni, Amit Golani, and Biswapati Sarkar began pitching shows targeting young people to MTV. Faced with rejection, The Viral Fever was founded when the group came together and released a video titled Rowdies on YouTube starring Deepak Kumar Mishra and Naveen Kasturia. The runaway success of the video prompted Arunabh to create the YouTube-focused video company, The Viral Fever, in 2012.

Growth on Youtube (2012–2014)
The Viral Fever released the first Barely Speaking with Arnab video with an interview of Shah Rukh Khan, and an appearance by then and current Delhi Chief Minister, Arvind Kejriwal. Biswapati Sarkar's parody of Indian news anchor Arnab Goswami was widely appreciated. TVF's content was dominated by parodies during these years with videos like Gaana Waala Song, Gangs of Social Media and Munna Jazbaati contributing to the growing popularity of the channel. The channel was recognised as one of the first success stories of original digital content in India.

Pioneering web-series in India (2015–present)
After a few years of creating "viral videos", The Viral Fever released India's first web series, Permanent Roommates, in 2014. Featuring then-unknown actor Sumeet Vyas and Nidhi Singh, Permanent Roommates has been watched over 5 crore (50 million) times. Pitchers was lauded as one of the best shows in recent memory in Indian entertainment for capturing the zeitgeist of the Indian startup scene. In 2016, The Viral Fever released the smash hit Tripling, and the widely applauded Humorously Yours. Other TVF network channels like Girliyapa, The Screen Patti and The Timeliners have also successfully debuted web series.

TVFPlay & funding from Tiger Global (early 2016–present)
TVF debuted their own platform, TVFPlay, releasing the final two episodes of Pitchers. The platform saw 10 lakh (1 million) hits in the first two days and crashed for 3 hours. In early 2016, venture capital firm Tiger Global invested $10 million into TVF, acquiring a 20% stake in the company. TVF has since launched other YouTube channels for original content: Girliyapa, a female-run channel, The Screen Patti, and The Timeliners, headquartered in New Delhi. TVF currently has offices in Mumbai and New Delhi.

Branded entertainment
TVF is one of the most sought after creators of original content with brands in India. TVF claims to have worked with over 150 brands. Some major companies to have worked with TVF or allied channels in the past include Asiazi, Procter & Gamble, Ola, Flipkart, Vodafone, Bharti Airtel, OnePlus, Xiaomi, Nokia and Tata Motors.

Content

The Making Of... (2014)
Focused on the making of entertainment products in India, ranging from a blockbuster movie to a decade long TV soap. The first season of The Making Of... comprised five episodes, with a standalone episode released for Season 2 in 2016.

Permanent Roommates (2014–present)

Permanent Roommates is an Indian web series created by TVF and Biswapati Sarkar. This series revolves around a young couple, Tanya and Mikesh, who after being in a long-distance relationship for 3 years, face the prospect of marriage. The first season was released on YouTube on 31 October 2014. The second season was released on TVFPlay, TVF's video streaming medium, on 14 February 2016. Permanent Roommates was lauded for its portrayal of live-in relationships in conservative urban Indian families. Actors Sumeet Vyas and Nidhi Singh have gone on from Permanent Roommates to be showcased in Bollywood films.

Barely Speaking with Arnub (2014–present)
A talk show starring Biswapati Sarkar as Arnub with a U, parodying Indian news anchor Arnab Goswami. Barely Speaking with Arnub was picked up after the success of an earlier video titled "Bollywood Aam Aadmi Party" featuring Jitendra Kumar, Nidhi Bisht, and novelist Mayank Shekhar. The parody talk show has been lauded for its portrayal of the loud and boisterous nature of Indian news where anchors prefer theatrics over nuance. Season one of the show opened with an interview with Shah Rukh Khan. Popular celebrities who have appeared on the show for an interview with Sarkar include Delhi Chief Minister Arvind Kejriwal, Ranveer Singh, Parineeti Chopra, Sunny Leone and Chetan Bhagat. In the first two seasons, Biswapati Sarkar, Amit Golani, Vipul Goyal, Shivankit Parihar, Jasmeet Singh Bhatia, and Abhishek Upmanyu have been writers on the show.

Barely Speaking with Arnub returned for a shortened season two in 2016. The show has been on hold as writer Biswapati Sarkar focuses on writing web series including the sequel to TVF Pitchers.

TVF Pitchers (2015—present)

TVF Pitchers is an Indian web series created by TVF and developed by Arunabh Kumar single-handedly with assisting efforts from others. The first season consists of five episodes and premiered online on TVFPlay on 10 June 2015. A week later, on 17 June, it premiered on YouTube. The season finale premiered on TVFPlay on 30 August 2015. It follows four friends, Naveen, Jitu, Yogi and Mandal, who quit their jobs in order to develop their own start-up company.

In 2016, TVF announced December 2017 as the projected release of Season 2 of Pitchers with the last scene of Permanent Roommates, but it failed to materialise later. Later, TVF gave a hint of the TVF pitchers season 2 by uploading a scene of pitchers in its video 'Shows From The House Of TVF | 2021'

The second season premiered on December 23, 2022 on ZEE5.

TVF Tripling (2016)

TVF Tripling is an Asian Television Award-winning Indian web series created by TVF. It traces the story of three siblings Chandan, Chanchal & Chitvan. Together they start a hilarious journey, to find themselves and their relations. Starring Sumeet Vyas, Maanvi Gagroo and Amol Parashar, and written by Sumeet Vyas and Akarsh Khurana, along with some other contributions, the series has won several awards, including a Kyoorius Blue Elephant. TVF partnered with Tata Motors for the project to promote the newly launched Tata Tiago. Tripling was recognised as one of the best web-series of 2016 and is a benchmark of success in Indian branded content. Season 2 of the series was released on 5 April 2019.

Chai Sutta Chronicles (2013–present)
Chai Sutta Chronicles is TVF's Jim Jarmusch-inspired series about conversations between friends. Each episode has a theme, and centers on a conversation over a cigarette and a cup of tea. Season 1 of Chai Sutta Chronicles aired in 2013, with season 2 released in 2017 and 2018.

Tech Conversations With Dad (2014–present)
An ongoing TVF series about Jeetu and his conversations with his father, often about technology, relationships, and families in India. This is TVF's longest-running digital title with 10 videos in 4 years.

Bisht, Please! (2017)
Nidhi Bisht's solo vehicle, released in 2017, about a small-town Indian girl who moves to the city.

Humorously Yours (2016-present)
Long-time TVF writer, and stand-up comic Vipul Goyal features in a semi-autobiographical story about the life of a stand-up comic. The show furthered TVF's reputation for story-telling in the Indian context. Humorously Yours was renewed for a second season, released in 2019.

F.A.T.H.E.R.S (2017)
A Tech Conversations with Dad spin-off, Fathers features three veterans of the Indian television screen, Brijendra Kala, Gajraj Rao, and Atul Srivastava, playing three fathers trying to keep up with the times.

Inmates (2017)
Inmates is a sitcom about living in Mumbai in the 21st century, starring Ashish Verma, Mukti Mohan and Aakansha Thakur, and writers Raghav Raj Kakkar and Kashyap Kapoor.

Bachelors (2016–present)
Bachelors is a show about four bachelors who live together and encounter hilarious situations as they face the world after college. In 2016, TVF released a pilot episode of Bachelors featuring popular YouTube star Bhuvan Bam. The success of the pilot led to a 4 episode extension with Bhuvan and over 25 million views. Bachelors was picked up for Season 2, released in late 2017, with Jitendra Kumar replacing Bhuvan Bam as the lead. Season 2 has also crossed 25 million views since release and was listed among the best web-series of 2017 by FilmCompanion and Indian Express, and was applauded by various sects of audience for its satirical timing, and spoofs of popular Bollywood movies such as Dangal (film), Bahubali (film) and Chak De! India among many others.

The Aam Aadmi Family (2016)

The Aam Aadmi Family is an offering from TVF's sister channel The Timeliners. It is an album of moments from the life of a middle-class family based in Delhi. It has garnered an average of 8 million views across 3 seasons.

Flames (2018)
Flames is another offering from TVF's sister channel The Timeliners. It is the story of a young romance unfolding as a chemical reaction. Studious Rajat falls for Ishita, the new girl in the tuition. Rajat's friends, Pandey & Anusha's friendship is beginning to turn into a relationship. The equations of friendships evolve in the first season of this teenage romance. This series has already garnered an average of 5 million views.

Season 2 of the show has just landed on the OTT space, and all five episodes are currently streaming on the OTT platform MX Player, as well as on TVFPlay.

Zeroes (2018)
Zeroes is a mini-series from The Screen Patti. It is about four zeroes who come together with an almost delusional ambition to create a great company despite being already late in the startup race. Whether they rise above their label of zeroes is what forms the crux of the story.

Yeh Meri Family (2018)

Yeh Meri Family is a mini-series released by TVF. It is about a nuclear-middle-class family living in the height of fad of the 1990s. The story revolves around a 13-year-old boy who is average at academics and is constantly being bullied and blackmailed by his elder brother. It is a mixture of the drama and thrills of being a teenager.

Awkward Conversations With Parents (2018)
Awkward Conversations With Parents is a six-episode series produced by The Screen Patti. The story is about a modern-boy named Ishan and his down-to-earth, ritual parents. Ishan is in his late teens; a year before he leaves the home for college. He and his parents are involved in strange talks about absurd topics revolving around the desires of a growing-into-an-adult boy. The series involves various absurd topics such as condoms, wet dreams, etc.

College Romance (2018)
College Romance is a 5-episode series by TVF sister channel The Timeliners about three best friends looking for love, laughs and some lifelong memories while attending college together. A second season was released in 2021 which revolves around the problems they are facing in their relationships, friendships, etc.

ImMature (2018) 

ImMature is a TVF original released in 2019. It stars Omkar Kulkarni, Rashmi Agdekar, Chinmay Chandranushush and Visshesh Tiwari in the lead roles. The show follows a one-conflict-per-episode format that ties into the protagonist Dhruv's larger quest to befriend his love interest Chhavi.

TVF Insiders (2019) 

TVF Insiders is an experimental psychological thriller web series based on the life of 4 teenagers who unwilling meet each other every Saturday. The storyline of this show is based on the absurd imagination of all four characters.

It features Omkar Kulkarni (Of  ImMature  fame), Himika Bose, Ritviq Joshi and Arnav Bhasin in the lead role.
The show is co Written and directed by Pranav Bhasin. The music and background score is composed by Achint Thakkar (who composed the Scam 1992 theme song).

The show is streaming on MX player and TVF Play app.

Kota Factory (2019)

Kota Factory is a TVF original released in 2019. The series moves around the IIT and Medical entrance coaching industry of Kota, a small town in Rajasthan state of India. It focuses on the life of Vaibhav, who leaves his home town and arrives in Kota to pursue coaching for the preparation of IIT Exam. The series portrays the life of an IIT aspirant during his preparation phase, and also focuses on the different sides of the 'Kota Coaching Industry'. It has been directed by Saurabh Khanna. Kota Factory is one of the first Indian black and white web series on YouTube.

Later, both TVF and Netflix announced the second season of Kota Factory which premiered on Netflix on 24 September 2021.

Gullak (2019)

Gullak is a web series that revolves around the life stories of the "Mishra Family", talking tales relatable to a common man's everyday life. The series was created by Shreyansh Pandey. The first season, released on 27 June 2019 on TVF Play and SonyLIV was directed by the critically acclaimed director of many popular web stories, Amrit Raj Gupta. The second season was directed by Palash Vaswani and was aired on the OTT platform SonyLIV in 2021. This series features Jameel Khan, Geetanjali Kulkarni, Vaibhav Raj Gupta and Shivankit Singh Parihar.

Cubicles (2019)
Cubicles is centered around the life of Piyush, a fresh entrant into the corporate world. The show follows his work life and moments like his very first salary, working weekends, and failures and successes that are a part of anyone's corporate journey. Simultaneously, the series attempts to integrate fundamental concepts of investing and mutual funds into the story. Created by Amit Golani and directed by Chaitanya Kumbhakonum, the series stars Abhishek Chauhan, Nidhi Bisht, Arnav Bhasin, Shivankit Singh Parihar, and Badri Chavan, among others.

Cheesecake (2019)
Cheesecake is a comedy drama web series created by TVF and released on Mx Player.

It features Jitendra Kumar and Akansha Thakur in lead roles.

Hostel Daze (2019)

Hostel Daze was created by TVF, and is a compilation of stories depicting the lifestyle and fun of undergraduates who live in a hostel, along with the bullying of seniors being one of their many experiences with the hostel and its residents. The series was released on Amazon Prime Video on 13 December 2019. The entire series was shot in the campus and hostel of Symbiosis International University, Pune. The series was written and created by Saurabh Khanna and Abhishek Yadav, and was directed by Raghav Subbu, critically acclaimed for directing TVF's series Kota Factory. The series features Adarsh Gourav, Shubham Gaur and LUV in key roles of three freshers, and also casts Nikhil Vijay, Badri Chavan and Harsha Chemudu among many others.

Panchayat (2020)

Panchayat is a web series produced by TVF,released on Amazon Prime on 3 April 2020. This critically acclaimed web series revolves around the Panchayat of a village called Phulera in Ballia district of Eastern Uttar Pradesh, The series features Jitendra Kumar, who plays the role of a young graduate and the secretary of the Panchayat of the village, who is constantly at war with himself, trying to adapt himself to the lifestyle of the villagers, while keeping his dream of cracking the CAT, Common Admission Test. The series also casts veteran actors like Raghubir Yadav and Neena Gupta. The series marked the debut for Chandan Roy as an actor, playing the role of assistant secretary of the Panchayat. His work is being praised by many cinema critics.

Panchayat Season 2 (2022) 

On 28 April 2022, the second season was announced after the completion of the production. On 2 May 2022, it was announced that the second season will premiere on 20 May 2022. However, Prime Video released all the episodes on 18 May 2022, two days earlier than its actual premiere date.

TVF Aspirants (2021)

TVF Aspirants is a web series that depicts the life of UPSC aspirants who are living in Rajender Nagar, Delhi. This series features Naveen Kasturia, Shivankit Parihar, Abhilash Thapliyal and Sunny Hinduja in the lead roles., along with Namita Dubey and Bijou Thaangjam.It is the most rated IMDB webseries of India The show was created by Arunabh Kumar and Shreyansh Pandey, written by Deepesh Sumitra Jagdish, and directed by Apoorv Singh Karki.

Engga Hostel (2023)

Engga Hostel is a web series produced by TVF,released on Amazon Prime on 27 January 2023. This is remake series of the Hostel Daze.

Members
As of 2017, the TVF Group has a total team of more than 240 members in Mumbai and Delhi. However, per credible media reports, some of the key members from the core team of TVF walked out in August 2020. Some of the notable members are:
 Jitendra Kumar
 Arunabh Kumar
 Naveen Kasturia
 Vipul Goyal
 Amol Parashar
 Nidhi Singh
 Ahsaas Channa
 Shivankit Singh Parihar
 Sumeet Vyas
 Anandeshwar Dwivedi
 Anant Singh "Bhaatu"
 Vaibhav Bundhoo
 Deepak Kumar Mishra
 Badri Chavan
 Sameer Saxena
 Biswapati Sarkar
 Nidhi Bisht
 Chandan Kumar
 Abhinav Anand "Bade"
 Arun Kushwah "Chote"

Controversy
In March 2017, Arunabha Kumar found himself in the middle of a sexual harassment claim that was posted anonymously via Medium. Several women have come out with similar stories of harassment. TVF released a press release via Medium refuting the claims. A first information report (FIR) has been filed against Kumar in this case.

Mumbai's Versova Police registered a second FIR against Kumar after another woman filed a complaint against him over an incident she said took place in 2014. On 16 June 2017, Kumar stepped down as TVF CEO. Dhawal Gusain now leads the company as CEO, with Karan Chaudhry stepping in as COO and the creator of Permanent Roommates & Tripling Sameer Saxena appointed as CCO.

See also
 Amazon Prime Video
 Sony Liv

References

External links
 TVF Play

YouTube channels